The Abeyi Liberation Front was a guerrilla organization in Sudan, active in the Abyei region of South Kordofan in the early 1980s. The group had emerged amongst the Ngok Dinka, in response to attacks on their community by Misseriya Arabs supported by police and army forces. The ALF was one of the armed groups active during this period that were linked to the 'Anyanya II' movement of Southern army mutineers. The commanders of ALF were Deng Alor Kuol and Chol Deng Alaak. Around 1984 the ALF was contacted by Sudan People's Liberation Army detachments from Ethiopia and incorporated into the SPLA.

References

Factions of the Second Sudanese Civil War
Rebel groups in Sudan
South Kordofan